The 1986 Hexagon World Men's Curling Championship, the men's world curling championship, was held from March 31 to April 6 at the CNE Coliseum in Toronto, Ontario, Canada.

Teams

Round-robin standings

Round-robin results

Draw 1

Draw 2

Draw 3

Draw 4

Draw 5

Draw 6

Draw 7

Draw 8

Draw 9

Tiebreakers

Round 1

Round 2

Playoffs

Semifinals

Bronze medal game

Final

Awards
 Colin Campbell Award: Uli Sutor

External links

1986 in Canadian curling
World Men's Curling Championship
Curling in Toronto
International curling competitions hosted by Canada
March 1986 sports events in Canada
1986 in Toronto
April 1986 sports events in Canada